Widnes Vikings competed in their fourth consecutive Super League season in 2005 but would be relegated to the National League One at the end of an extremely disappointing year for the Vikings. In preparation for the start of the 2005 season they had appointed Frank Endacott, who had previously coached the Wigan Warriors, as well as signing former NRL prodigy Owen Craigie to the club. It was hoped that these men could once again lead Widnes to Super League safety once again and bounce back from a dismal 2004 season. While the Vikings managed to finish 11th in the League like last season they were nonetheless relegated due to the pending introduction of the Catalans Dragons in the 2006 season, they would not return to the top flight until 2012.

2005 fixtures and results

2005 Super League Results

2005 Challenge Cup Results

References 

Widnes Vikings seasons
Widnes Vikings season